Gulmarg Gondola in Gulmarg,  Jammu and Kashmir, an administered union territory of India is the second longest and second highest cable car in the world.  Higher lines include the  Dagu Glacier Gondola.

Background

The two-stage gondola lift ferries about 600 people per hour to and from Kongdoori Mountain, a shoulder of nearby Apharwat Peak. The ropeway project is a joint venture of the Jammu and Kashmir government and French firm Pomagalski. The second stage was completed in a record time of about two years at a cost of 180,000,000 Indian Rupees (i.e. some US$4.5 million) and opened on 28 May 2005. The French company had also built the first phase of the gondola project, connecting Gulmarg to Kongdoori, in 1998.

The timing of the gondola is 10 AM (IST) to 5 PM (It's highly dependent upon the weather at both stages). A gondola can carry six people at a time. The price is 700 Indian Rupees (11 US$) for the first stage and 900 Indian Rupees (15 US$) for the second stage. Also offered is Chair Cars for phase-II for 300/- INR. It takes approximately 9 minutes to reach the first stage and 12 minutes for second stage.

An accident occurred on 15 June 2017 due to an enormous pine tree being uprooted by a gust of wind and breaking the perspex windows on one of the gondola cabins, causing it to swing violently and its seven occupants to fall  to the ground.  Gulmarg Gondola grossed revenue of about  100 crore in FY 2022-2023.

Gallery

References

External links
 Official website
 Description by Remontées Mécaniques (French)
 Article in BBC News of 26 February 2009

Tourist attractions in Baramulla district
Aerial tramways in India
Gondola lifts
Transport in Jammu and Kashmir